The variable goshawk (Accipiter hiogaster) is a bird of prey native to Indonesia, Papua New Guinea and the Solomon Islands. It was recently elevated to species status, and was previously lumped together with the grey goshawk.

Subspecies
Subspecies include:
 A. h. sylvestris - Wallace, 1864
 A. h. polionotus (Salvadori, 1889)
 A. h. mortyi (Hartert, 1925)
 A. h. griseogularis (Gray, GR, 1861)
 A. h. obiensis - Hartert, 1903
 A. h. hiogaster (Müller, S, 1841)
 A. h. pallidiceps (Salvadori, 1879)
 A. h. albiventris (Salvadori, 1876)
 A. h. leucosomus (Sharpe, 1874)
 A. h. misoriensis (Salvadori, 1876)
 A. h. pallidimas - Mayr, 1940
 A. h. misulae - Mayr, 1940
 A. h. lavongai - Mayr, 1945
 A. h. matthiae - Mayr, 1945
 A. h. manusi - Mayr, 1945
 A. h. dampieri (Gurney Sr, 1882)
 A. h. lihirensis - Stresemann, 1933
 A. h. bougainvillei (Rothschild & Hartert, 1905)
 A. h. rufoschistaceus (Rothschild & Hartert, 1902)
 A. h. rubianae (Rothschild & Hartert, 1905)
 A. h. malaitae - Mayr, 1931
 A. h. pulchellus (Ramsay, EP, 1882)

References

variable goshawk
Birds of the Maluku Islands
Birds of New Guinea
Birds of the Solomon Islands
variable goshawk